Fayaz Ahmad Mir is  Indian  politician and a   Former Member of Parliament of the Rajya Sabha he represented the state of Jammu & Kashmir in Rajya Sabha He is also believed to have developed close connections with top Politicians in New-Delh.

References

1977 births
Living people
Rajya Sabha members from Jammu and Kashmir
Jammu and Kashmir Peoples Democratic Party politicians